Burmannia pusilla is an annual herb, found in wet or damp places. It is native to Cambodia, China (Yunnan province), India (Assam, Goa, Karnataka, Kerala, Maharashtra, Meghalaya, Tamil Nadu), Laos, Malaysia, Myanmar, Singapore, Thailand, and Vietnam.

References

Burmanniaceae